Operation Strike Fear can refer to:
Code name for the 2007 Baghdad crackdown in the 2003- Iraq War
Part of the fictional Galactic Civil War in the Star Wars storyline